Texoceras is an extinct ammonoid genus in the monotypic goniatitid subfamily Texoceratinae, included in the family Adrianitidae. These are shelled cephalopods more closely related to squids, belemnites, octopuses, and cuttlefish than to nautiloids from which they are derived.

Texoceras, named and described by Miller & Furnish in 1937, has an involute, subglobular shell, like Adrianites, with a narrow, deep umbilicus in the middle, but with a reticulate surface and a suture that forms 14 rounded lobes.

References

 Miller, Furnish, and Schindewolf 1957. Paleozoic Ammonoidea; Treatise on Invertebrate Paleontology, Part L, Ammonoidea; Geological Soc. of America and Univ of Kansas.press. 
Texoceras, and Texoceratinae in Goniat online 12/02/10
 Texoceratinae -Paleobiology Database 12/02/10 
 Texoceras - Paleobiology Database 11/18/10

Goniatitida genera
Adrianitidae
Ammonites of North America